Andrija Zlatić (born January 25, 1978) is a Serbian sport shooter. He is currently a member of Aleksa Dejović Užice.

In 1998 Andrija became junior world champion in shooting in Barcelona, Spain.
At the 2002 ISSF World Shooting Championships he won a silver medal. At the 2004 Summer Olympics he represented Serbia and Montenegro. He was a first athlete from his country who qualified for 2004 Summer Olympics.
Eight years later he again became world vice champion in Munich, Germany.

Zlatić triumphed in the 2011 World Cup Finals in Wrocław and won  “Crystal Globes” in the 50m pistol category.

At the 2012 Summer Olympics, he won a bronze medal in the 10m Air Pistol and finished 6th in the 50m Pistol.

References

External links
 ISSF Profile
 

1978 births
Serbian male sport shooters
ISSF pistol shooters
Shooters at the 2004 Summer Olympics
Shooters at the 2012 Summer Olympics
Olympic shooters of Serbia and Montenegro
Olympic shooters of Serbia
Olympic medalists in shooting
Olympic bronze medalists for Serbia
Sportspeople from Užice
Living people
Medalists at the 2012 Summer Olympics
European champions for Serbia
Shooters at the 2015 European Games
European Games competitors for Serbia

Mediterranean Games silver medalists for Serbia
Competitors at the 2009 Mediterranean Games
Mediterranean Games medalists in shooting